Central Kwara'ae is a parliamentary constituency electing one representative to the National Parliament of Solomon Islands. It had a registered electorate of 8,977 in 2006, and 9,955 in 2010. It is one of fourteen constituencies in Malaita Province.

The constituency was established for the Fifth Parliament in 1993, and its first MP was Alfred Maetia. Fred Fono won the seat in 1997, and was twice re-elected, ultimately becoming deputy Prime Minister in 2007. He stood for a fourth term in 2010, but was unseated by political newcomer and independent candidate Jackson Fiulaua, in what was described as "the major upset" of the election. Fiulaua then became Minister for Infrastructure and Development in Danny Philip's government.

Results in 2010
In the 2010 general election, there were eleven candidates for the seat, including nine independents, incumbent Fred Fono for the newly formed People's Congress Party, and Philip Akote'e for OUR Party. Akote'e finished third, ahead of eight independents, with 331 votes. Fono was second, with 2,379 votes, while Fiulaua took the seat with 2,936. The turnout rate was 67%.

Members of Parliament by year
The following MPs have represented Central Kwara'ae in the National Parliament.

References

Solomon Islands parliamentary constituencies
1993 establishments in the Solomon Islands
Constituencies established in 1993